Cool Relax  is the second studio album by Jon B. It was released by Tracey Edmonds' label Yab Yum Records and distributed by Epic Records subsidiary 550 Music on September 16, 1997.

Background and recording
Cool Relax was the follow-up to his 1995 debut Bonafide. Jon assumed the role of having more creative control on his second album. On his debut, he was given leeway to write and produce, but Edmonds and her then-husband Babyface were heavily involved in the making of Bonafide. Jon was confident in the material for his new album, but fought with Edmonds and Babyface over certain songs to keep on the project.

Aside from his work, Jon sought outside production from Tim & Bob, Johnny J, David Foster and Ali Shaheed Muhammad of A Tribe Called Quest, among others. The song that became the first single "Don't Say", was written by former Boyz II Men and Az Yet member Marc Nelson. Jon overheard Nelson playing the song in the record company's parking lot and asked to record it for his album. The music video for the single featured a then-unknown Sanaa Lathan as the female love interest.

"They Don't Know" was released as the next single, with a music video directed by Christopher Erskin. The song's B-side "Are U Still Down" was also issued despite objections from the record company, as it featured vocals from the then-deceased Tupac Shakur who died when Jon started recording the album. Jon received assistance from Shakur's mother Afeni Shakur, who gave Jon permission to clear his vocals for the song.  He would record a sequel to "Are U Still Down" called "Part 2" with a posthumous appearance by Shakur on his 2004 album Stronger Everyday.

The next single was the song "I Do (Whatcha Say Boo)". The song originally appeared on his demo tape prior to recording Bonafide- as did the album track "Can We Get Down". The final single was the title track, which had a remix that featured Guru from the hip hop group Gang Starr. The song was produced by Ali Shaheed Muhammad, who Jon sought out due to being a longtime fan of A Tribe Called Quest. "Pride & Joy" was originally recorded by Toni Braxton for her sophomore album Secrets, but the song never made the final track listing. Jon later recorded the song for himself, while giving her the song "In the Late of Night" for her album.

The last song on Cool Relax- "Tu Amor"- was penned by songwriter Diane Warren. Jon felt the song didn't fit in with the rest of the album and was done at the request of Epic Records in seeing the potential of the song becoming a huge hit. Almost a decade later, the song would be covered by Mexican pop group RBD for their English language album Rebels.

One song that didn't make the track list was "Paradise in U". A little over a decade later, he included the song on his 2008 album Helpless Romantic.

Track listing
Credits adapted from liner notes and Allmusic.

Personnel 
Credits adapted from liner notes and Allmusic.

Ali Almo – backing vocals
Keith Andes – keyboards, producer, vocal arrangement
Atlass – backing vocals
Jon B. – backing vocals, producer, Vocoder, vocal arrangement, mixing
Agnes Baddoo – stylist
Tom Bender – mixing assistant
Kyle Bess – mixing assistant
Paul Boutin – engineer, mixing assistant
Ian Boxill – engineer, mixing
Tim Carter – hair stylist
Greg Collins – assistant engineer, mixing assistant
Matthew Cross – engineer
Kevin Crouse – mixing assistant
Dahoud Darien – keyboards, producer
Desiree Diggs – make-up
Sheila E. – percussion
Nathan East – bass guitar
Kevon Edmonds – backing vocals
Melvin Edmonds – backing vocals
Tracey E. Edmonds – executive producer
Felipe Elgueta – engineer
Dave Elias – bass guitar
Toni Estes – backing vocals
David Foster – keyboards, producer
Simon Franglen – synthesizer, programming
Roy Galloway – backing vocals
Jon Gass – mixing
Jeff Griffin – mixing assistant
Reggie Griffin – bass guitar
Gene Grimaldi – mastering
Mick Guzauski – mixing
Stephanie Gylden – assistant engineer
Reggie Hamilton – guitar, bass guitar
Jack Hersca – mixing assistant
Zulma Iracheta – design
Mauricio Iragorri – mixing assistant
Eric Jackson – guitar
Bernard Jacobs – illustrations, stylist

Johnny J – producer
Jon-John – keyboards, producer
Melanie Jones – mixing assistant
Tim Kelley – keyboards, producer, engineer, vocal arrangement, drum programming, mixing
Khris Kellow – backing vocals
David Kopp – guitar
Paul Lani – engineer, mixing
Ricco Lumpkins – assistant engineer
Manny Marroquin – engineer, mixing
Tony Maserati – mixing
Michael McQuarn – executive producer
Ali Shaheed Muhammad – producer, engineer, mixing
Paul Naguna – assistant engineer
Natie – rap
Marc Nelson – backing vocals, producer
Bennett Novak – design
Dean Parks – acoustic guitar
Greg Phillinganes – keyboards
Lance Pierre – engineer
Pluto – co-producer
Bob Powers – engineer, mixing
Dave Reitzas – engineer
Michael Rich – assistant engineer, mixing assistant
Bob Robinson – keyboards, producer, vocal arrangement
Jason Rohrbach – assistant engineer
Thom Russo – engineer
Colin Sauers – engineer, assistant engineer, mixing assistant
Michael Schlesinger – engineer
Eddy Schreyer – mastering
Matt Silva – assistant engineer
Brian Smith – engineer, mixing assistant
Alvin Speights – mixing, mixing assistant
Jay Strauss – photography
Michael Thompson – guitar, electric guitar
2Pac – producer
The Ummah – producer
Steve Van Arden – engineer
Carlos Warlick – engineer

Certifications

References

1997 albums
550 Music albums
Jon B. albums
Albums produced by Tim & Bob
Albums produced by David Foster
Albums produced by Johnny "J"